Phill (usually a diminutive of Phillip) may refer to:

Phill Brown (born 1950), British audio engineer
Phill Calvert (born 1958), Australian rock drummer and producer, played in the influential post-punk band "The Birthday Party"
Phill Davies (born 1981), English rugby union player
Phill Drobnick (born 1980), American curler
Phill Grimshaw (1950–1998), English typeface designer and calligrapher
Phill Hartsfield (1932–2010), Southern California sword and knifemaker
Phill Jones (born 1974), New Zealand professional basketball player
Phill Jupitus (born 1962), English comedian, cartoonist, DJ, guitarist, performance poet and presenter of radio and TV
Phill Kline (born 1959), American former district attorney of Johnson County, Kansas, USA
Phill Lewis (born 1968), American film and television actor
Phill G. McDonald (1941–1968), American military personnel
Phill Niblock (born 1933), American composer, filmmaker, videographer, and director of Experimental Intermedia
Phill Nixon (born 1956), English darts player from Ferryhill, County Durham, UK
Phill Wilson (born 1956), American activist

See also
Philip (name)